We'll Take Care of the Teachers is a 1970 West German comedy film directed by Harald Reinl and starring Uschi Glas, Hansi Kraus and Fritz Wepper. It was the fifth in a series of school-set films.

The film was shot at the Bavaria Studios in Munich and on location in Baden-Baden amongst other places.

Cast
Uschi Glas as Marion Nietnagel
Hansi Kraus as Pepe Nietnagel
Fritz Wepper as Hubert Böhm
Rudolf Schündler as Studienrat Dr. Knörz
Ruth Stephan as Dr. Pollhagen, student councilor
Hans Terofal as Pedell Bloch
Balduin Baas as Blaumeier, senior student councilor
Karl Schönböck as Munk
Doris Kiesow as Mrs. Taft
Monika Dahlberg as Miss Weidt
Kristina Nel as schoolgirl
Jutta Speidel as schoolgirl
Darko Popovtschak as pupil
Peter Geigner
Michael Riffelmacher
Theo Lingen as Dr. Taft / Gotthold Emmanuel Taft

References

External links

1970 comedy films
German comedy films
West German films
Films directed by Harald Reinl
Constantin Film films
Films shot at Bavaria Studios
1970s German films